Triton is a fictional character appearing in American comic books published by Marvel Comics. Created by Stan Lee and Jack Kirby, the character first appeared in Fantastic Four #45 (December 1965). He belongs to the subspecies of humans called inhumans, who are born with superhuman abilities.

Triton made his live action debut in the Marvel Cinematic Universe (MCU) with the 2017 television series Inhumans, portrayed by Mike Moh.

Publication history

He first appeared in Fantastic Four #45 (December 1965), and was created by Stan Lee and Jack Kirby.

Fictional character biography
Triton is member of the Inhumans' Royal Family, son of Mander and Azur, brother to Karnak, and cousin to Gorgon, Black Bolt, Maximus, Medusa, and Crystal. Triton was born on the city-state island of Attilan and was exposed to the Terrigen Mist as an infant. The mists altered his body, turning his skin green and giving him the ability to breathe underwater, as well as surviving the cold temperatures and incredible pressures of the deep. An unfortunate side effect was the loss of the ability to survive in a non-aquatic environment. As a result, he lived in a specifically designed area of Attilan, requiring a special breathing apparatus to leave the water. The apparatus, cumbersome at first, was eventually reduced in size by fellow Inhuman, Maximus the Mad. Triton's mutation after Terrigenesis was so severe that his parents disallowed his brother Karnak from going through it.

Triton later first encountered the Fantastic Four. During an accidental encounter, he tells his fellow Inhumans he recognizes the Hulk from Reed Richard's micro-film files. Triton acquires an artificial life support system which enabled him to exist out of water. He then first left the Great Refuge with the other members of the Royal Family, acting as a scout for them. He is freed from the "negative zone" barrier, along with the rest of the Inhumans. He aids the Fantastic Four in battle against Blastaar.

Triton later met the Sub-Mariner, and then battled Plantman's Leviathan. He aided the Inhuman Royal Family in defeating Maximus's attempt to overthrow the Great Refuge. He then singlehandedly captured Maximus, and battled the Mandarin alongside the Royal Family. He traveled to New York to warn the Avengers of the Inhumans' involvement in the Kree-Skrull War.

Triton battled Blastaar and the Kree Kaproids. He traveled to New York City with the Royal Family seeking aid for the earthquake threatened Attilan, and battled Shatterstar. He was imprisoned by Maximus, and then aided the Royal Family in the defeat of Maximus and his evil Inhumans. He left Earth with the Inhuman Royal Family to prevent the Kree subjugation of the Inhumans, and battled various aliens. He battled Kree agents and returned to Earth and battled the Kree agent, the Pursuer. He battled the Hulk alongside the Royal Family.

Triton participated in the Inhuman exodus when Attilan was relocated to Earth's Moon. He grappled with the Avengers under Maximus's mind control. He accompanied Medusa to Earth when she fled Attilan to avoid compulsory abortion by order of the Genetic Council. Triton battled mutated aquatic life caused by toxic waste.

Triton has maintained a friendship with Namor the Sub-Mariner and has occasionally been involved in stories with Marvel's other ocean-dwelling characters. He had pivotal roles in major crossover stories such as the Kree–Skrull War and Atlantis Attacks.

Triton expresses discontent to Black Panther and Storm when they visit Attilan's current moon location. He reveals that several underground chambers have been flooded for his benefit, but it is not satisfactory.

During the Secret Invasion storyline, the Inhuman royal family forges an alliance with the Kree to recover Black Bolt from the Skrulls' clutches. Together, they discover a weakness in the Skrull's defense and split up to recover the resources to exploit it. Triton is sent to the all-water planet Pelagia where he encounters a race of mermen-like beings that closely resemble him in appearance. He develops feelings for the native, Dascylla. Although outnumbered by the hostile Pelagians, Triton manages to overcome them and find what he seeks. His breathing harness is then upgraded by the Kree allowing him to operate in the vacuum of space thus enabling him to physically attack the Skrulls' ship during the rescue.

During Civil War II, Triton grows discontent with Medusa's dovishness to Tony Stark's aggression against New Attilan. He enlists the help of Maximus to provoke Stark against Medusa to force her to attack. Maximus convinces Lash to attack one of Stark's factories, but it contains civilians. Captain Marvel and the Avengers attack Medusa, but during that time Stark attacks New Attilan. To Triton's shock, Maximus lowers Attilan's defenses, allowing Stark to enter. Medusa surrenders, but Triton gives himself up as it was his idea to free Maximus. SHIELD takes him to the Triskelion prison.

During Inhumans vs. X-Men, Maximus free Triton from the Triskelion with the promise of finding a way to recreate Terrigen Crystals. Triton, Lineage, and the Unspoken travel around the world gathering ingredients. Ultimately, Maximus instead creates a giant robot with a Terrigen sword to kill the X-Men, but The Unspoken attacked and absorbed the Terrigen sword. Triton vowed to kill Maximus if he didn't follow through with the plan, but doesn't since Maximus is the only one who knows the formula.

Karnak and Lockjaw go to find Triton, but Maximus controls him and makes him attack his brother, so Karnak incapacitates him. He is allowed back into the Royal Family.

In Death of the Inhumans, the Kree have murdered thousands of Inhumans that would not join them. This causes Black Bolt requested a meeting with the four Queens of the Inhumans tribes to respond to this threat. When Triton tries to learn what transpired, he discovers that Black Bolt has been wired with an explosive which isactivated when Triton touches him. Triton is killed in the explosion, although most of the Royal Family is saved by Lockjaw's teleportation ability. It is later revealed that Triton is in some kind of stasis tank alongside Naja, Sterilon, and other unnamed Inhumans as they are being experimented on by the Kree.

Powers and abilities
Triton is a member of the Inhuman race, artificially mutated by the Terrigen Mist, giving him scaly greenish skin, a small dorsal fin running from the base of the skull to the forehead, membranous fins extending from his temples, and webbing between his toes and between his fingers. Triton is able to breathe water, to swim at great speeds, and to withstand the pressures of the deep sea. He cannot naturally breathe air and needs near-constant contact with water to survive, and cannot exist out of water without artificial aids.  His resistance to deep sea pressure also gives him superhuman strength and speed underwater. He has the ability to survive underwater indefinitely, and the ability to withstand the temperature and pressure of ocean depths. His vision is more sensitive to the green portion of the visible spectrum, enabling him to see in relatively dark ocean depths.

Triton has undergone basic Inhuman royal militia training. When on land, Triton employs a water circulation system consisting of lengths of plastic tubing which run along his torso and limbs, maintaining a constant mist of water and providing a supply of fresh water to his gills.

Reception

Accolades 

 In 2020, CBR.com ranked Triton 17th in their "20 Most Powerful Inhumans" list.
 In 2021, Screen Rant included Triton in their "10 Most Powerful Members Of Marvel's Inhumans" list.
 In 2022, CBR.com ranked Triton 7th in their "10 Inhumans Who Should Join The Avengers" list.
 In 2022, Screen Rant ranked Triton 8th in their "Marvel's 10 Most Powerful Aquatic Characters" list.

Other versions

Amalgam Comics
In the Amalgam Comics continuity, Triserinak - a combination of DC's Serifan and Marvel's Triton and Karnak - is a member of the superhero group Un-People in Amalgam Comics universe.

Earth X
In the alternate future of Earth X Triton has undergone a change, becoming even more fish-like. He assists the Royal family in an investigation of just what has happened to Earth.

Heroes Reborn

Triton and his Inhuman allies revere Galactus and his heralds in this alternate universe.

Later, in Heroes Reborn #3, Triton is seen as one of the many heroes on board the well-outfitted, shrinking spaceship belonging to Doctor Doom. He, along with many other heroes and Inhumans, must return to the main Marvel universe or all those within the alternate one will be endangered. Despite Doom's lust for power endangering the mission, everyone who has to return safely does.

Marvel Zombies
In Marvel Zombies, Triton appears as part of the S.H.I.E.L.D. Resistance Nick Fury sets up in order to combat the infection. Triton later appears, infected, attacking Cyclops during the final battle between the infected and the uninfected. Later, he travels with the zombie Inhumans to eat human clones that are under the control of the Kingpin. A zombie Triton later makes an excursion to the Marvel Apes world, along with infected super-powered beings. They kill one person (Marvel Chimp). Triton's body is heavily damaged and all the zombies are sent back to their home realm by local heroes. However his arm is left behind and this is used as a dimensional locater by the now-infected 'Iron Mandrill' in an ongoing attempt to re-open and potentially dominate the zombie universe.

Ultimate Marvel
An Ultimate Marvel version of Triton appeared, along with the other Inhumans, in Ultimate Fantastic Four Annual #1. The Inhumans first encounter the Fantastic Four over the problem of Crystal who has run away from home.

In other media

Television
 Triton has appeared in the 1990s Fantastic Four TV series, voiced by Rocky Carroll in the first appearance and by Mark Hamill in later appearances.
 Triton appears in the Hulk and the Agents of S.M.A.S.H. episode "Inhuman Nature", voiced by James Arnold Taylor. Triton appears with Lockjaw on the beach, taking Crystal back to Attilan, after they are also chased by A-Bomb. Then in a showdown with the Agents of S.M.A.S.H., he discovers that Maximus has been secretly planning, creating a devastating weapon to destroy humanity. In this show, he does not need to be in contact with water to survive and has actually spent most of the episode without water.
 Triton appears in Ultimate Spider-Man voiced again by James Arnold Taylor. In this version, Triton specifically refers to Karnak as his cousin rather than brother. In the episode "Agent Venom," he can be seen as one of the young superheroes that S.H.I.E.L.D. is monitoring. Triton makes his first full appearance in the episode "Inhumanity" as an exchange student from Attilan helping Spider-Man deal with Molten Man at the waterfront. Triton is under the impression because he is such a good fighter in Attilan, he doesn't need any back up. Upon returning to the Triskelion (which is where the S.H.I.E.L.D. Academy is located), Triton is revealed to be mistrusted by the other students. However, Triton is thrown into S.H.I.E.L.D. custody by Nick Fury when Attilan is above New York and Medusa declares war. Being the only one who believes he is not a spy, Spider-Man convinces Nick Fury to give the two time to solve this matter peacefully. It is revealed that Maximus the Mad had taken control over the royal family, and the true mastermind behind the attack. However, Spider-Man and Triton are able to stop him. As an apology from Nick Fury, Triton is made the Attilan ambassador to S.H.I.E.L.D. In the episode "Agent Web," Triton accompanies Spider-Man to the abandoned Inhuman city of Atarog to rescue Nick Fury where they come across Madame Web and uncover a plot by Crossbones and the HYDRA Agents with him to use Nick Fury as a bargaining chip to obtain Madame Web. After Crossbones was thwarted and Nick Fury takes Madame Web to a new location, Spider-Man and Triton are confronted by the Inhuman Royal Family. When Spider-Man apologizes on Triton's behalf for trespassing at Atarog while explaining their reasons for it, Medusa interprets for Black Bolt stating that they are here to give them a ride back to the Triskelion. In the two-part "Graduation Day" final, Triton joins his fellow heroes in helping Spider-Man to protect Aunt May and defeat Sinister Six members Kraven the Hunter and Vulture, though it part of trap Doctor Octopus set to capture all the heroes in a contracting shield. After being freed, Triton graduated from the S.H.I.E.L.D. Academy alongside his friends.
 Triton appears in the Guardians of the Galaxy episode "Crystal Blue Persuasion." He is among the Inhumans who came down with a Terrigen Plague that caused them to grow crystals on their body. Triton was seen at the end of the episode when Medusa thanked the Guardians of the Galaxy for their help on Black Bolt's behalf.
 Triton appears in the Avengers Assemble episode "The Inhuman Condition." He is among the Inhumans who are captured by Ultron but later freed by the Avengers.

 Triton appears in the live-action Inhumans TV series, portrayed by Mike Moh. In light of the Inhuman outbreak, Triton appears at the beginning of the episode "Behold... The Inhumans" where he attempts to rescue a newly transformed Inhuman girl with yellow eyes named Jane from military forces who are hunting her in Hawaii and secretly working for Maximus. The girl is killed while Triton is shot and falls into the ocean. This causes Gorgon to head to Hawaii to look for Triton where one attempt by him to search for Triton underwater led to Gorgon being saved by some passing surfers. Triton returns alive and well in "Havoc in the Hidden Land" where it is revealed that he faked his injury as part of Black Bolt's plan to draw out Maximus. Following Gorgon's death and the apprehension of the Inhumans recruited by Maximus, Triton arrives at the beach in the area where he is to meet up with Black Bolt after laying low. Afterwards, he returns to Attilan where he and the Inhuman Royal Family plan to take back the throne from Maximus. After defeating some Inhuman Royal Guard members that are on Maximus' side, Triton is tasked with capturing Maximus and brings him back to Black Bolt after defeating him in combat where Maximus reveals the failsafe of Attilan that he caused. He aids his family with evacuating the citizens of Attilan and finally leaves himself through Lockjaw. Triton is last seen with the evacuated Inhumans as Medusa gives a speech about them finding a new home on Earth.
 Triton appears in the Marvel Future Avengers anime series, voiced by Hiroyuki Yoshino in Japanese and Michael Sinterniklaas in English.

Video games
 Triton appears as a non-playable character in the video game Marvel: Ultimate Alliance, voiced by Tom Kane. Gorgon mentions that Triton will accompany him and Crystal into fighting Doctor Doom while the heroes went to the Skrull Homeworld.
 Triton appears as a playable character in Lego Marvel Super Heroes 2.

References

External links
 Triton at Marvel.com
The Inhumans at Don Markstein's Toonopedia. Archived from the original on September 17, 2016.

Characters created by Jack Kirby
Characters created by Stan Lee
Comics characters introduced in 1965
Fictional characters with superhuman durability or invulnerability
Fictional mermen and mermaids
Inhumans
Marvel Comics characters who can move at superhuman speeds
Marvel Comics characters with superhuman strength
Marvel Comics superheroes
Marvel Comics supervillains
Marvel Comics television characters